Dylan Parker (born 11 October 1999) is an English professional footballer who plays for Rugby Town as a striker.

Career
Parker joined Stratford Town at the age of five. He moved to Walsall in October 2017, turning professional in July 2018. He made his senior debut on 28 August 2018 in the EFL Cup. After a further two EFL Trophy cup appearances, he moved on loan to Rushall Olympic on 1 January 2019. He made his debut for Rushall the next day, and "put in an impressive display". He moved on loan to Leamington in March 2019. After leaving Walsall, he returned to Stratford Town, before moving to Rugby Town in September 2019.

References

1999 births
Living people
English footballers
Stratford Town F.C. players
Walsall F.C. players
Rushall Olympic F.C. players
Leamington F.C. players
Rugby Town F.C. players
Association football forwards